Teresa Murphy is a former camogie player, winner of a Cuchulainn All Star award in 1964.

Career
First selected for Cork in 1959, Munster in 1960, she won Munster inter-county championship medals in 1963 and 1964, and a Munster club medal with Glen Rovers in 1964.

References

External links
 Camogie.ie Official Camogie Association Website

Living people
Year of birth missing (living people)
Cork camogie players